U.S. Route 421 (US 421) is part of the United States Numbered Highway System that runs from Fort Fisher, North Carolina to Michigan City, Indiana. In the U.S. state of North Carolina, US 421 travels  from its southern terminus at Fort Fisher to the Tennessee state line near the community of Zionville, North Carolina. US 421 traverses the state from east to west travelling from the coastal plains to Appalachian Mountains. It provides an important connection between the cities of Wilmington, Sanford, Greensboro, Winston-Salem, and Boone. Despite being signed as north–south, much of the routing of US 421 in North Carolina runs in an east–west direction, particularly between Greensboro and the Tennessee state line. Portions of US 421 have been upgraded to freeway standards including the majority of its routing between Sanford and North Wilkesboro.

US 421 was established in 1931 between Greensboro and Boone, North Carolina replacing North Carolina Highway 60 (NC 60). In 1932, the highway was extended northwest through Sugar Grove to Mountain City, Tennessee, and southeast along NC 60 to Wilmington. US 421 was extended south from Wilmington to Fort Fisher in 1936, replacing NC 40. Since 1936, the highway has been upgraded and readjusted throughout North Carolina.

A majority of the highway is part of the North Carolina Strategic Highway Corridors system.  Because of this designation, the state has made numerous changes converting a rural two-lane highway into a major freeway/expressway with 4 or more lanes. Numerous former segments of the highway named "Old U.S. Route 421" are found along the entire route.

Route description

US 421 starts at a parking/dock area on the Cape Fear side of Pleasure Island.  Within , US 421 passes through its unsigned junction with NC 211 and the approach to the Fort Fisher Ferry Terminal, where travelers can board to cross the Cape Fear River toward Southport.  Immediately after the ferry terminal is the Fort Fisher State Recreation Area, where the first and second battles of Fort Fisher took place.

The highway continues north, going through popular tourist destinations in New Hanover county: Kure Beach, and Carolina Beach. US 421 eventually enters Wilmington along the river side of the city.  At Wooster Street, it goes west, overlapping with several other highways and funnels through Brunswick County before returning in northwestern New Hanover County; there it links with Interstate 140 (I-140) before continuing north towards Clinton.

After its intersection with NC 210, it becomes a rural two-lane highway for much of its remainder until Dunn. There is one rest area located just north of Delway. US 421 meets I-95 in Dunn.

After crossing downtown Dunn and Erwin immediately to the west, US 421 becomes a four-lane divided highway again until reaching Lillington, with a short segment in Buies Creek containing a center lane and reduced speed limit as it crosses Campbell University.  Upon reaching the junction with US 401, NC 27, and NC 210, all four routes collect onto a thoroughfare heading south over the Cape Fear River into downtown Lillington. US 421 then splits off to the west, following two-lane Front Street until Sanford (though speed limit never actually increases).

Upon reaching Sanford, US 421 formerly followed Horner Boulevard with NC 87 to cross downtown, but it is now rerouted onto the recently completed Sanford Bypass, the entirety of which is freeway.  It runs concurrent with NC 87 Bypass until the US 1/US 15/US 501/NC 87 interchange, from which it continues until the end of the bypass near Cumnock.

For the rest of its route until Wilkesboro, US 421 remains almost entirely free-flowing.  It is an expressway from Sanford to just south of Siler City, bypassing Goldston, Bear Creek, and Siler City. From here to the Greensboro Urban Loop, US 421 becomes a freeway, bypassing Staley, Liberty, and Julian. All of these cities/places were connected by US 421's old alignment, now called some variant of Old US 421 for the majority of its route.

Near Pleasant Garden, US 421 joins I-85 on the Greensboro Urban Loop, staying with the loop as I-85 leaves and I-73 joins it.  Another  later, US 421 leaves the Greensboro Urban Loop to join I-40 and continue westward towards Winston-Salem.  Near Kernersville, US 421 gains the name Salem Parkway which utilizes the former I-40 Business which was to replace an earlier section of mainline I-40, going through downtown Winston-Salem.  Extensive reconstruction of the freeway through Winston-Salem was completed from 2016 to 2020, and when completed I-40 business was removed from it, and the Salem Parkway name became official.

West of Winston-Salem and its final interchange with I-40, US 421 continues as a freeway towards Yadkinville and Wilkesboro.  When the highway nears North Wilkesboro, the highway passes North Wilkesboro Speedway (access via exit 282); there is also a visitor center built in 2009 as the state's first environmentally friendly rest area, located at mile marker 283.  As US 421 enters Wilkesboro city limits, it downgrades to an expressway with various stores and restaurants along it.

Access to the Blue Ridge Parkway is located at Deep Gap, as US 421 continues on towards Boone.

As US 421 approaches Boone, the expressway comes to an end just before an intersection with Old US 421. The road continues into Boone as four lane boulevard, becoming two lanes at the intersection with US 321. US 321 north, US 421 north, and NC 194 south all run concurrent through the downtown area via King Street.  After leaving Boone, US 421 continues on as a two-lane road to the Tennessee state line, heading on to Mountain City.

Designations 

US 421 overlaps with two state scenic byways: the Cape Fear Historic Byway, in downtown Wilmington,  and the U.S. 421 Scenic Byway, between Deep Gap and Boone. Two of North Carolina's Bicycle Routes run concurrent for portions of US 421. North Carolina Bicycle Route 5 is concurrent from US 421's southern terminus at Fort Fisher to north of Snows Cut, through downtown Wilmington to Blueberry Road near Montague, North Carolina, and a short portion near Coats. A small part of North Carolina Bicycle Route 3 is concurrent with US 421 in downtown Wilmington.

History

1931 - US 421 officially appears on highway maps starting from Winston-Salem (junction with US 70/170) to Boone at King/Hardin Street intersection (junction with US 221/321).  It was solely within the state of North Carolina and was completely overlapped with NC 60.
1932 - US 421 was extended both north and south.  North from Boone, it extended to Sugar Grove where it then replaced US 321 heading towards Mountain City, Tennessee; US 321 redirects towards Elizabethton, Tennessee.  From Winston-Salem, the highway is routed to Wilmington following NC 60.
1933 - Highway was realigned around Boone (using a straighter alignment) and in Greensboro (Market Street).
1934 - NC 60 is completely removed from its original route, leaving US 421.  NC 60 gets renumbered on a short highway in Cherokee County, where it continues to this day.
1936 - US 421 is extended south from Wilmington to Carolina Beach, Kure Beach, and Fort Fisher, replacing NC 40.
1951–1952 - US 421 bypasses Clinton (on what would be today's Faircloth Freeway).  The Wilkesboro area is realigned through town to North Wilkesboro.
1954–1955 - US 421 is rerouted going west out of Wilmington via US 17/74/76, then north following NC 133.
1957–1958 - US 421 is realigned onto a straighter routing between Deep Gap and Wilkesboro.  US 421 is redirected out of North Wilkesboro, old routing is renumbered as US 421-A (Now US 421 Business).  US 421 is placed onto one-way streets within Winston-Salem (using 4th and 5th streets), it is also rerouted in Greensboro going from Market Street to the freeway O. Henry Blvd.  Between Erwin and Dunn, US 421 is realigned onto a new four-lane expressway.
1962–1963 - US 421 is realigned onto a new road near Sugar Grove and Zionville, leaving the communities of Amantha and Mabel.  Between Yadkinville and Winston-Salem, US 421 is given its current alignment, expanding to a freeway after the Yadkin River to I-40; it then overlaps with I-40 (later called Business 40) through downtown Winston-Salem.  In Harnett County, US 421 is moved north, avoiding the community of Mamers, and enters Lillington via Front Street.  US 421 is straighten out through Harrells.
1964–1968 - US 421 becomes one-way streets through downtown Greensboro (Market Street and Madison/Gaston Avenues).  US 421 is rerouted onto the new Faircloth Freeway in Clinton.
1969–1970 - US 421 is rerouted onto the new Cape Fear Bridge in Wilmington.  US 421 is realigned around Bonlee and Bear Creek.
1971–1984 - US 421 completes its bypass around Wilkesboro.  Between Greensboro and Staley is upgraded to expressway standards (Joseph M. Hunt Jr Expressway) and bypasses the communities of Pleasant Garden, Climax, Julian, and Liberty.  US 421 is rerouted in Sanford, avoiding the community of Broadway.
1987–1990 - The Siler City bypass is completed. US 421 is rerouted going north around Greensboro then going south on Henry Boulevard (US 29).
1994–1999 - US 421 is removed from all surface roads from Kernersville to Greensboro, follows I-40 to Joseph M. Hunt Jr Expressway.
2000–2003 - US 421 is realigned and widen to 4-lane freeway between Yadkinville to Wilkesboro and a 4-lane expressway between Wilkesboro to Boone (though some parts already pre-existed for before 2000).  This completes US 421 as a 4-lane (or more) highway from Sanford to Boone.
2008 - US 421 is realigned in Greensboro to follow the new southern loop, overlapping with I-73 and I-85 to Joseph M. Hunt Jr Expressway.  This was done to give drivers a route direction to Winston-Salem after I-40 returned to its original routing after one year on the southern loop.
2012 - In Boone, a  section, known as King Street, was widened from four to six lanes with a raised concrete median from US 321 (Hardin Street) to east of NC 194 (Jefferson Road).  The project cost $16.2 million.

Project reconstruction of highway in Winston-Salem

In Winston-Salem, a  section from west of Fourth Street to east of Church Street was reconstructed between 2018 and 2020 to completely upgrade and streamline.  The project included removing the existing pavement and replacing it with new concrete pavement, upgrade and modernize entrance and exit ramps, and replace most of the bridges on and over the freeway.  Work began on this rehab in 2018 with the closure of several miles of U.S. 421. The closed section was reopened earlier than expected in early February 2020. Concurrent with the rehabilitation of the route, the Interstate 40 Business designation was dropped from the entire route, with the route remaining U.S. 421, exits renumbered to US 421 mileage, and the highway taking on a new name, The Salem Parkway.

Future

Future Interstate 685

In September 2019, the Greensboro Urban Area Transportation Advisory Committee (GUATAC) passed a resolution in support of giving US 421 interstate designation between I-40 in Greensboro and I-95 near Fayetteville and bringing it up to interstate standards. The resolution noted that an interstate along US 421 would provide a “valuable alternate route for military and freight traffic” as well as “additional evacuation routes and relief and recovery routes to the region.” The resolution also stated that US 421 becoming an interstate would “support economic development, including the four designated megasites in the Carolina Core.” The resolution states that the North Carolina Board of Transportation has already passed a resolution in support of the future interstate designation for US 421.

The passage of the Infrastructure Investment and Jobs Act in November 2021, proposed to upgrade US 421 to Interstate status, possibly as I-685. The new Interstate designation would overlay the existing freeway from I-85 south of Greensboro to the east side of Sanford, and then follow a new alignment from Sanford to I-95 near current exit 70.  The bill contains language designating the US 421 corridor as a "high priority corridor" between I-85 and I-95.  Seven counties along the proposed route have explicitly endorsed the new Interstate designation. In May 2022, AASHTO approved the designation of the corridor as Future I-685.

In June 2022, the Wilmington Metropolitan Planning Organization (WMPO) recommended that Future I-685 should be extended from Dunn to Wilmington, suggesting that the corridor would improve connections to military bases and the Port of Wilmington along with improving the economy of the area.

Proposed Piedmont Triad Interstate Spur
In August 2022, the Piedmont Triad Partnership proposed upgrading the existing US 421 to an interstate from Winston-Salem to Wilkesboro. The Wilkes County commissioners approved a resolution supporting action that is part of the process of getting US 421 designated an interstate the same month. In November 2022, the Forsyth County Board of Commissioners passed a resolution also in favor of the effort.

Cape Fear Skyway
In New Hanover and Brunswick counties, the Cape Fear Skyway has begun its project development studies (since 2007) to build a toll road and bridge that will bypass Wilmington.  Early estimates range from $950 million to $1.1 billion.  The environmental impact study was completed in 2014, a record of decision and a complete financial feasibility was done in 2015. The project has been re-prioritized and delayed numerous times.  In 2018, NCDOT stated that construction would not start before 2029. While in August 2019, NCDOT halted design and planning of the bridge, putting the project on hold indefinitely.

Junction list

 

Note – Exit numbers west of Winston-Salem are aligned when US 421 went north around Greensboro in late-1980s/early-1990s.

Alternate names

Though the highway is commonly known as "421" throughout the state, the highway does have other known names it uses locally in areas.

Burnett Boulevard - Road name briefly used in Wilmington, between Carolina Beach Road and 3rd Street.
Carolina Beach Road - Road name from Seabreeze to Burnett Boulevard in Wilmington.
Cornelius Harnett Boulevard - Road name from Main Street to Lillington city limit.
Cumberland Street - Road name within Dunn city limits.
Delway Highway - Road name between Harrells and Delway in Sampson County.
Doc and Merle Watson Highway - Official name of highway between the Wilkes/Watauga county line to Boone.
Don Buie Highway - Name used from US 1 to Cumnock Road in Sanford
Faircloth Freeway - Road name within Clinton city limits.
Fort Fisher Boulevard - Road name from Kure Beach to south terminus of US 421.
Front Street - Road name from main street to Lillington city limit.
King Street - Road name within Boone city limits.
Lake Park Boulevard - Road name within Carolina Beach city limits.
Jackson Boulevard - Road name within Erwin city limits.
Joseph M. Hunt Jr Expressway - Road name from Randolph/Guilford county line to I-85; expressway continues on into Greensboro, which was an old US 421 alignment.
Paul Green Memorial Highway - Road Name from Erwin to Lillington.
Plain View Highway - Road name from US 13 in Spivey's Corner to I-95 near Dunn.
Main Street - Road name between Cornelius Harnett Boulevard and Front Street in Lillington.
Northwest Boulevard - Road name from Clinton to Kitty Fork.
Salem Parkway - Road name through Forsyth County and a small portion of Guilford County between its junctions with Interstate 40.
Spivey's Corner Highway - Road name from Kitty Fork to US 13 in Spivey's Corner.
Taylors Bridge Highway - Road name from Delway to Clinton.
Watson Brame Expressway - Road name throughout Wilkes County.
Wilmington Highway - Road name from the Sampson/Pender county line to Harrells.

See also

 Special routes of U.S. Route 421
 U.S. Route 21

References

External links

21-4
Transportation in Greensboro, North Carolina
Transportation in Winston-Salem, North Carolina
Transportation in New Hanover County, North Carolina
Transportation in Brunswick County, North Carolina
Transportation in Pender County, North Carolina
Transportation in Sampson County, North Carolina
Transportation in Duplin County, North Carolina
Transportation in Harnett County, North Carolina
Transportation in Lee County, North Carolina
Transportation in Chatham County, North Carolina
Transportation in Randolph County, North Carolina
Transportation in Guilford County, North Carolina
Transportation in Forsyth County, North Carolina
Transportation in Yadkin County, North Carolina
Transportation in Wilkes County, North Carolina
Transportation in Watauga County, North Carolina
 North Carolina